Caroline Aerodrome  was a registered aerodrome located  northwest of Caroline, Alberta, Canada.

References

External links
Place to Fly on COPA's Places to Fly airport directory

Defunct airports in Alberta
Clearwater County, Alberta